The Roman Catholic Diocese of Opole ( is a diocese located in the city of Opole in the Ecclesiastical province of Katowice in Poland.

History
 1945: Established as Apostolic Administration of Opole
 28 June 1972: Established as Diocese of Opole, part of the ecclesiastical province of Wrocław, from the Upper Silesian part of the Archdiocese of Wrocław and the General Vicariate of Branice of the Archdiocese of Olmütz
 25 March 1992: made part of the ecclesiastical province of Katowice, lost territory to establish Diocese of Gliwice

Special churches
Minor Basilica:
 Sanktuarium św. Anny on the Góra Świętej Anny  (Saint Anne's Mountain)

Leadership
 Bishops of Opole (Roman rite)
 Bishop Franciszek Jop (1972 – 1976.09.24)
 Archbishop Alfons Nossol (1977.06.25 – 2009.08.14)
 Bishop Andrzej Czaja (since 2009.08.14)

See also
Roman Catholicism in Poland

Sources
 GCatholic.org
 Catholic Hierarchy
  Diocese website

Roman Catholic dioceses in Poland
Roman Catholic Diocese of Opole
Christian organizations established in 1972
Roman Catholic Diocese of Opole
Roman Catholic dioceses and prelatures established in the 20th century